Flight into Danger is a 1956 Canadian live television play starring James Doohan, Corinne Conley and Cec Linder. It was written by Arthur Hailey, produced and screened by CBC Television, and broadcast on April 3, 1956, on the General Motors Theatre series. It was later adapted into two different feature films, a parody feature film, a novel, and international television versions in the United States, the United Kingdom, Germany, and Australia.

Plot
While on a flight from Toronto, Ontario, to Vancouver, British Columbia, the pilots at the controls of a Canadair North Star, a large commercial airliner, fall victim to food poisoning. Approximately half of the passengers have also been incapacitated by eating the same fish served to the pilots. After the stewardess (Corinne Conley) asks for help from the passengers, George Spencer (James Doohan), an ex-Second World War Spitfire fighter pilot, is forced to take over, with the stewardess's assistance.

Cast

Production
 
Playwright Hailey, a former British pilot in the Second World War, emigrated to Canada in 1947. He began working as a sales promotion manager for a tractor-trailer manufacturer in Toronto. On a flight between Vancouver and Toronto in 1955, he came up with the original idea that spawned Flight into Danger. The story of an airliner whose passengers and crew were threatened by an unforeseen event such as food poisoning was written in only nine days and shopped about as a screenplay. The Canadian Broadcasting Corporation, whose television service was less than four years old, bought the script for $600.

The production acquired the cockpit of a Royal Canadian Air Force (RCAF) Canadair North Star and had it shipped by road to RCAF Station Trenton, where the filming took place, including aerial shots. The Malton Airport at Malton, Ontario, present day Toronto Pearson International Airport, was also used for the airport scenes.

Reception
When Flight into Danger was broadcast live-to-air on April 3, 1956, on the network's General Motors Theatre, it was seen by two million people and received a resounding positive reaction. "In the words of one journalist, it was 'probably the most successful TV play ever written anywhere'." A kinescope of the live production was broadcast in August 1956 due to viewer demand. The play was remade with a new cast and production staff on NBC's anthology series The Alcoa Hour on September 16, 1956, and later the same month the original CBC version was shown by the BBC in the United Kingdom and was a major factor in the supervising producer of CBC's television dramas, Sydney Newman, being brought across to work in the UK. There he made a significant impact on the British television drama industry.

In 1957, Flight into Danger was adapted into the feature film Zero Hour! and, in 1962, the story was adapted for an episode of the BBC series Studio 4. In 1964, a German version of the television film was produced under the title Flug in Gefahr. Czechoslovak radio (Československý rozhlas) has produced it as part of the radio series Let do nebezpečí, directed by Jiří Horčička. An Australian television version was produced in 1966.

In Flight into Danger, Hailey created the template for future disaster films. Character-driven plot lines built up among diverse characters would dominate, with brief episodes or flashbacks giving back stories, and all the individual stories coming together at the climax. Hailey and John Castle novelized the story as Runway Zero-Eight (1958), which was dramatized in 1971 as Terror in the Sky, a Movie of the Week. The story was more famously parodied in the 1980 comedy Airplane!.

References

Notes
Hailey's story was adapted as a novel by John Castle (a pseudonym for Ronald Payne and John Garrod), with Hailey receiving credit as co-author. The book was called Flight into Danger (Souvenir Press) for its British publication in 1958, but retitled Runway Zero-Eight (Doubleday) for its American publication in 1959.

Citations

Bibliography

 Fromow, D. L. Canada's Flying Gunners: A History of the Air Observation Post of the Royal Regiment of Canadian Artillery. Ottawa, Ontario, Canada: Air O.P. Pilot's Association, 2002. .
 Haliley, Sheila. I Married a Best Seller: My Life with Arthur Hailey. New York: Open Road Media, 2014. .
 Kay, Glenn and Michael Rose.Disaster Movies: A Loud, Long, Explosive, Star-studded Guide to Avalanches ... Oakville, Ontario, Canada: Mosaic Press, 2006. .
 Sparber, Max.  Ultra-Actors: William Shatner.  Seattle, Washington: Ultramod, 2011. .

External links

English-language Canadian films

1956 television films
1956 films
Canadian aviation films
Canadian drama television films
CBC Television original films
Films set on airplanes
Films with screenplays by Arthur Hailey
1950s English-language films
Films directed by Gabriel Axel
1950s Canadian films
Canadian black-and-white films